Tropical wood may refer to either
Tropical and subtropical moist broadleaf forests
Tropical timber, a forestry product grown in those forests